Alberta Bible College is a Canadian Bible college offering Christian Higher education to young adults and older adults in Alberta. Non-Denominational, ABC is born of roots in Christian Churches and Churches of Christ

ABC offers two different ways to take courses. The traditional college format with two semesters is available as people are more accustomed to. The second is Professional Adult Christian Education (PACE), a one-night-per-week non-traditional accelerated degree completion and diploma program designed for adult learners.

Programs

PACE 

 3-year Diploma/Bachelors of Christian Ministry, Counselling
 3-year Diploma/Bachelors of Christian Ministry, Biblical Studies
 3-year Diploma/Bachelors of Christian Ministry, Leadership
 3-year Diploma/Bachelors of Christian Ministry, Non-Profit Leadership

College 
1-year The Rock - Certificate in Christian Foundations
2-year Diploma - Diploma of Christian Ministry, Christian Studies
2-year Degree - Bachelor of Christian Studies: General Studies Major (Degree Completion)
4-year Degree - Bachelor Christian Studies, Christian Ministries Major
4-year Degree - Bachelor of Sacred Literature
4-year Degree - Bachelor of Theology

History

Founders
Helen McGilvary's motion at a July, 1932, congregational meeting of Central Church of Christ, Lethbridge, Alberta, created Alberta Bible College (ABC).  Charles Henry ("C. H.") Phillips convened classes October 3, 1932 with Roscoe E. Hollister and, later that school year, eight other students in an unfinished church basement in a classroom sectioned off by a curtain.

From the outset, ABC's founding was a collaborative effort of several Alberta congregations. But E. E. Breakenridge, a Calgary businessman and an elder at Tuxedo Park Church of Christ, Calgary, was full partner in this effort with C. H. Phillips.  Phillips came from an Anglo-Caribbean plantation family, born in London, England, according to one account, who immigrated to Saskatchewan as a 24-year-old. As that young man, he came to Canada "utterly disgruntled" with the brand of Christianity that perpetuated unbearable inequalities between the clergy and the poor.

"C. H." was exposed to the Restoration Movement by the pioneer Disciples of Christ preacher R. J. Westaway, and he went to study at Eugene Bible University (now, Northwest Christian College) in Oregon. From his studies, C. H. brought a vision of church growth by way of educating men and women for the leadership ministry of the church. In a special 1932 edition of The Alberta Christian, a newsletter of the Alberta Christian Missionary Society, Phillips noted that "There is no question as to the need of such a college in this Northwestern (sic) division of our Dominion. We have the young people in our churches. We know of several who would avail themselves of intensive preparation of the various trained ministries of the churches were it possible."

E. E. Breakenridge was a former Baptist who became a member of Tuxedo Park Church of Christ in 1934.  With A. G. Spaeth who donated a building and land in Calgary at 2720 Centre Street North, J. W. Jenkins, the Hovises, J. H. Dean, and several others, Phillips and Breakenridge laid ABC's institutional foundations.  Phillips's vision was of "a program in classical English Bible."  As implemented, study of the Bible was allied to such as classical logic and rhetoric.  Breakenridge marshalled the resources of Disciples in southern and central Alberta to create the new school's financial and physical infrastructure.  In 1936, ABC was incorporated with a self-perpetuating board of trustees in continuity with its founding, provisional board, and in 1937 the school moved to the Centre Street property.

The College was a child of hope for the Stone-Campbell Restoration Movement in the context of its growth concurrent with the settlement of the Canadian West, and the challenge of developing an indigenous Canadian leadership.

Pioneers
In 1936, J. Merlin Hill of Oregon came to assist C. H. Phillips with teaching responsibilities.  When Phillips moved to Toronto to begin a ministry with Keele Street Church of Christ just prior to the 1937-1938 year, Hill assumed the principalship while serving as minister with Tuxedo Park Church of Christ.  In 1939, ABC's first graduates, Roscoe E. Hollister and Lawrence E. Horney, received the Bachelor of Theology degree.  E. G. Hansell, M.P. and several others assisted with teaching responsibilities.  When the Hills returned to Oregon in 1941, Melvin Breakenridge, a recent graduate, was called to be ABC's principal.  Breakenridge was supported in teaching responsibilities by other recent ABC graduates and senior students until he joined the Royal Canadian Air Force in spring, 1943.  C. H. Phillips returned as principal, and served until he suffered a severe heart attack in April 1949.  Roscoe Hollister acted as principal for the next year.  Because of concerns about Phillips's health, the trustees declined his returning.  Instead, they called Melvin Breakenridge from his ministry in Summerside, P.E.I., now with a Master of Divinity from Butler School of Religion.  Breakenridge served as principal for the next twelve years, reshaping the curriculum along the lines of liberal arts programs of the time.  In January 1962, the college moved into its new campus at 599 Northmount Drive N.W. from temporary digs at Cambrian Heights Church of Christ, next door.  Also in 1962, an administrative reorganization saw Breakenridge appointed academic dean, and E. G. Hansell (Member of Parliament, 1935-1958) was appointed ABC's first "president."

Wranglers
Accounts of the years from 1962 to 1967 differ somewhat on the gravity of ABC's situation, but they don't differ on the broad challenges that characterized this period:  the financial strain due to a capital building project and differences among trustees as to ABC's relationship with the All Canada Committee of the Disciples of Christ.  The situation was not helped by President Hansell's sudden decease from a heart attack in autumn, 1965.  By the 1966-1967 school year, enrolment fell to ten students.  The college was technically in receivership except for the patience of its main creditor, the Church of Christ Development Company led by John Bergman, an ABC alumnus.  In 1964, James Chapman took on responsibilities for fund-raising and the financial viability of the school.  At least one supporter extended a long-term, interest-free loan.  Robert Gonyea served as president from 1965.  In late 1965 or early 1966 after an especially difficult trustees' meeting, one expressed serious doubts about ABC's future.  Another trustee replied, "When you're in a mud-hole, you don't say 'whoa,' you shout 'giddap!'" Subsequently, the trustees recruited Boyd Lammiman to be president of ABC.

Builders
Boyd and Julia Lammiman resettled their family in Calgary during Canada's centennial summer, 1967.  Over the next seventeen years, Lammiman ("Mr. L") and the faculty and staff upgraded academic standards and created the "Christian Service Lab" and internship practicum.  With Miss Aileen Case, Lammiman instituted predictable administrative process for the school's academic year.  With James Chapman, Lammiman improved ABC's relations with its constituency, both donors and congregations.  Alice Fraser (now, Mitchell), M.Div. (Cincinnati) was made full-time dean and instructor in 1967 till her departure in 1973.  Gary Hatt, M.Div. (Emmanuel) was recruited in her place in 1974.  In 1975, Ron Fraser, a recent graduate, came on-stream as a full-time instructor.  By ABC's 50th academic year 1981-1982, ABC was financially solvent, its faculty and staff were paid on time, relations with its constituency were warm, and a record number of students was enrolled.  When a visiting college president was introduced to an ABC student in 1981, the student exclaimed, "This is the best Bible college in the world!"
Mr. Lammiman guaranteed that what had been built under his leadership would serve as a foundation for more things to come when he collaborated with the trustees to recruit a successor and to plan for an orderly transition.  With the completion of Mr. L's ministry in summer, 1984, Ron Fraser was simultaneously installed as the new president.

Among his first acts, Fraser recruited John Wilson to return to Alberta from a new church ministry in P.E.I. to be a full-time instructor.  This was only the beginning.  Fraser as president and Doug Dietz as chairman of the academic committee led the school in enrolment expansion, faculty and staff development, creation of a degree-completion program, and in a capital building campaign.  ABC moved from "599" to the former YMCA facility at 635 Northmount Drive N.W. after a significant renovation.  In 2008, ABC achieved accreditation with the Association for Biblical Higher Education. At approximately the same time, Dr. Ron Fraser asked the Board of Trustees to initiate a transition in view of his intention to retire as President of Alberta Bible College.

Recent Leadership
In February, 2010, Dr. Ron Fraser retired as President but remained as the academic dean of the College. A recent ABC graduate and MBA, Rob Pittman, was installed as President at the same time. However, Mr.  Pittman resigned from the College in May, 2011, and a second search for a president began. In May, 2012, the Board of Trustees called Dr. William Raccah to serve as president of the College. However, in May, 2013, Dr. Raccah and the Board of Trustees agreed his departure from the school to other ministries. In May, 2015, after an extensive search, the Board of Trustees called Dr. Stan Helton to be President of Alberta Bible College, effective July, 2015.

Alumni
By 1940, ABC students and alumni had served in sixteen pulpits in four provinces and three states.  This was just the beginning.

ABC students organized new churches beginning in 1939 in Calgary, and alumni have since organized churches in Alberta, British Columbia, Yukon, Northwest Territories, Saskatchewan, Manitoba, Ontario, Prince Edward Island, Nova Scotia, and New Brunswick.  Early ABC graduates – Tom and Leota Rash, Bill and David Howell Rees, Edna Hunt, and Frank and Marie Rempel – were pioneers in the direct-support missions movement.  ABC alumni served cross-culturally on every continent, planting churches, translating the Bible, educating local leadership, publishing Christian literature, smuggling Bibles behind the iron curtain, and teaching English as a second language.  ABC alumni pursued advanced theological education, coming back to ABC to teach as well as at other Bible colleges, seminaries, and universities.  They also pursued the professions of teaching, engineering, nursing, medicine, and law.  ABC alumni sought to transform and contribute to culture as musicians and composers; in the academy (university) in various disciplines; in politics and public policy; in journalism, radio, and television; in business and entrepreneurship; and as public servants.  ABC alumni include "tentmakers," preachers and multiple staff ministers, elders, deacons, church development entrepreneurs, church planters, trustees, teachers and professors, youth group leaders, and camp deans and staff. Graduates have also served in thirty-one foreign countries.

Church ties
From its inception Alberta Bible College sought to be a catalyst for unity in the Stone-Campbell tradition in Canada. In the 1960s the College hosted an annual, week-long "Minister's Institute" for leadership of all three streams of the Movement, "to promote fellowship and understanding" transcending the Movement's divisions. Conciliatory speakers such as W. Carl Ketcherside were introduced to the Canadian West through this and other special events. A consensus of openness and goodwill has continued to evolve, with the College providing much of the leadership. In 1990, the College initiated the Western Canadian Christian Convention, a convention that included all three streams of the Stone-Campbell Movement. This led to a growing interface with the a capella Churches of Christ. A number from the latter churches have graduated from Alberta Bible College and either serve in or minister to Christian churches and churches of Christ or a capella Churches of Christ. The school hired its first instructor from the a capella Churches of Christ in 1997.

Academic emphasis
Alberta Bible College is accredited with the Association of Biblical Higher Education.  The "classical English Bible curriculum" remains the core of the College's ministerial training program, but as resources have allowed, other majors have been added. A unique emphasis of the academic program has been a heavy concentration on "practical experience."

References

 Douglas A. Barrie, "Alberta Bible College."  In his A History of the Christian Church and Christian Church (Disciples of Christ) in Alberta, Canada.  M.A. thesis.  Lincoln, Illinois:  Lincoln Christian Seminary, 1975, pp. 147–153.
 Melvin L. Breakenridge, "A Sketch of the History of the Alberta Bible College."  25th Anniversary booklet.  Calgary, Alberta:  Alberta Bible College, 1957.
 Ron A. Fraser, "Alberta Bible College." In The Encyclopedia of the Stone-Campbell Movement. Ed. by Douglas Foster, et al. Grand Rapids, Mich.: Eerdmans, 2004, pp. 23–24.
 Boyd L. Lammiman, "Joy Comes in the Morning." Unpublished. Calgary: Alberta Bible College, n.d.
 Boyd L. Lammiman, untitled history of Alberta Bible College, 50th anniversary yearbook.  Calgary, Alberta:  Alberta Bible College, 1982, pp. 83–96.
 Author unknown, 60th anniversary booklet, Calgary, Alberta:  Alberta Bible College, 1992.
 Russell E. Kuykendall, "Alberta Bible College: serving Christ vicariously for 75 years," 75th anniversary booklet, Calgary, Alberta: Alberta Bible College, 2007.

1932 establishments in Alberta
Bible colleges
Educational institutions established in 1932
Evangelical seminaries and theological colleges in Canada
Universities and colleges affiliated with the Christian Church (Disciples of Christ)
Universities and colleges in Alberta
Universities and colleges in Calgary